The men's 200 metres event at the 2014 Asian Games was held at the Incheon Asiad Main Stadium, Incheon, South Korea on 30 September – 1 October.

Schedule
All times are Korea Standard Time (UTC+09:00)

Records

Results
Legend
DNF — Did not finish
DNS — Did not start
DSQ — Disqualified

Round 1
 Qualification: First 4 in each heat (Q) and the next 4 fastest (q) advance to the semifinals.

Heat 1 
 Wind: +0.2 m/s

Heat 2 
 Wind: +1.1 m/s

Heat 3 
 Wind: +1.6 m/s

Heat 4 
 Wind: +1.2 m/s

Heat 5 
 Wind: +0.8 m/s

Semifinals
 Qualification: First 2 in each heat (Q) and the next 2 fastest (q) advance to the final.

Heat 1 
 Wind: 0.0 m/s

Heat 2 
 Wind: 0.0 m/s

Heat 3 
 Wind: 0.0 m/s

Final
 Wind: +0.3 m/s

References

Final results

200 metres men
2014